Simone Ann-Marie Edwards, OD (November 17, 1973 – February 16, 2023) was a Jamaican-American basketball player who played for the New York Liberty and the Seattle Storm and was the first Jamaican player in the Women's National Basketball Association (WNBA). The 6'4" center was known to fans as the "Jamaican Hurricane."

Career
Edwards did not play basketball in high school. She was spotted by an American college basketball coach after competing in a track meet in Jamaica. She first garnered attention on the court during junior college, at Seminole State College in Seminole, Oklahoma, leading the team to an undefeated conference record, ranking in the National Junior College Athletic Association Top 10. During her tenure, she became the First Kodak All-American in the school’s history. In 1996–97, she led the University of Iowa Hawkeyes in field-goal percentage (.557) during her senior season.

Edwards was one of three players picked out of over 300 athletes at a New York Liberty tryout camp.  She was chosen as a developmental player by the Liberty in 1997, but never saw a game until signing on with the newly inaugurated Seattle Storm in 2000. She was the only player to be a part of the team for every game of its first six seasons. Edwards won a WNBA championship with the Storm in 2004.

On May 19, 2006, just prior to the start of the 2006 WNBA season, Edwards announced her retirement from the WNBA. She retired as the team's all-time leader in rebounds, minutes, and games played.

From 1997 to 2007, Edwards played professional basketball in Europe and Israel. Edwards coached the Jamaican women's national basketball team and led them to a 2014 Caribbean Championship. On August 5, 2007, she was hired as an assistant coach at Radford University. Edwards was an assistant at George Mason University from 2008 to 2011.

Personal life and death
Edwards was named the National Spokesperson for Caribbean American Heritage Month for June 2017. On June 9, 2017, she released Unstoppable: A Memoir of Adversity, Perseverance & Triumph. On August 6, 2017, the Government of Jamaica appointed Edwards an Officer of the Order of Distinction (OD), which is bestowed on citizens of Jamaica who have rendered outstanding and important service to Jamaica in their field.

Edwards died from ovarian cancer on February 16, 2023, at the age of 49.

References

External links
Seattle Storm Player Profile
WNBA Player Profile
Simone Edwards' "Simone4Children" charitable foundation
May 20, 2006 Seattle Post-Intelligencer article on her retirement
May 19, 2006 Seattle Storm press release on her retirement
July 17, 2007 press release on joining Radford University's coaching staff
Radford University coaching profile
Basketballcamps with Simone Edwards
Simone Edwards, first Jamaican to play in WNBA, dies at 49

1973 births
2023 deaths
Sportspeople from Kingston, Jamaica
Iowa Hawkeyes women's basketball players
Radford Highlanders women's basketball coaches
Jamaican female sprinters
Jamaican women's basketball players
Centers (basketball)
Seattle Storm players
Basketball players at the 2007 Pan American Games
Pan American Games competitors for Jamaica
Jamaican women's basketball coaches
Deaths from ovarian cancer 
Deaths from cancer in Florida
Jamaican autobiographers
Women memoirists
Officers of the Order of Distinction